James Earl Ray (born July 27, 1957) is an American former professional basketball player. After playing college basketball at Jacksonville University, he was drafted fifth overall by the Denver Nuggets in the 1980 NBA Draft. He subsequently played three seasons for the team, appearing in 103 games and finishing with career averages of 3.4 points and 2.2 rebounds per game. Moving to Europe, he went on to play professionally in Italy, Spain and Turkey.

Post-career
In 2001, Ray was diagnosed with sarcoidosis. Due to his failing health and financial challenges, the NBA's retired players association provided him support. In 2008, Ray received a transplant, soon after receiving a diagnosis of having three months to live without one. The likelihood of receiving a transplant had been rated poorly, due to his need, at 6'9, of receiving lungs from a person taller than 6'5.

References

External links
 
 James Ray career statistics

1957 births
Living people
American expatriate basketball people in Italy
American expatriate basketball people in Spain
American expatriate basketball people in Turkey
American men's basketball players
Basketball players from New Orleans
CB Peñas Huesca players
Denver Nuggets draft picks
Denver Nuggets players
Fenerbahçe men's basketball players
Jacksonville Dolphins men's basketball players
Liga ACB players
Power forwards (basketball)